Marc Allen Wilkins (born October 21, 1970) is an American former Major League Baseball player. A pitcher, Wilkins played for the Pittsburgh Pirates from -. Wilkins attended high school at Ontario High School in Ontario, Ohio and college at the University of Toledo.

External links
Baseballcube.com profile
Baseball-reference.com profile

1970 births
Pittsburgh Pirates players
Sportspeople from Mansfield, Ohio
Living people
Toledo Rockets baseball players
Major League Baseball pitchers
Baseball players from Ohio
Carolina Mudcats players
Nashville Sounds players
Altoona Curve players
Durham Bulls players
Iowa Cubs players
Albuquerque Isotopes players